Dinter is a German surname meaning "manufacturer of ink". Notable people with the surname include:

 Artur Dinter (1876–1948), German writer and Nazi politician
 Daan van Dinter (born 1989), Dutch footballer
 Gustav Friedrich Dinter (1760–1831), German pedagogue, theologian and author
 Kurt Dinter (1868–1945), German botanist, and explorer in South West Africa

See also
 Gail Dinter-Gottlieb, American university administrator

German-language surnames
Occupational surnames